Olivier Couvreur (born May 23, 1970) is a French champion driver in the Championnat de France Formula Renault 2.0 and the Eurocup Formula Renault.

External links
 http://www.driverdb.com/drivers/5481/

Living people
French racing drivers
French Formula Renault 2.0 drivers
1970 births

French Formula Three Championship drivers
Graff Racing drivers
Formula Renault Eurocup drivers
BMW M drivers
Oreca drivers